is a Japanese manga series written and illustrated by Kai Ikada. The story follows a Tokyo teenager who moves to Japan's northernmost prefecture of Hokkaido and meets a girl unlike any he has ever met before. It has been serialized for free on the Shōnen Jump+ application and website since September 4, 2019, with the chapters collected and published into 10 tankōbon volumes by Shueisha as of March 3, 2023. An anime television series adaptation by Silver Link and Blade is set to premiere in 2023.

Premise
Teenager Tsubasa Shiki moves from Tokyo to the city of Kitami in Hokkaido. On arrival he meets his classmate and native gal Minami Fuyuki, who takes a liking to the city boy and takes him under her wing. Finding her unlike any other girl he has met before, Tsubasa finds himself drawn to this Hokkaido gal.

Characters

A 16-year-old transfer student from Tokyo, who has no experience with girls and was considered lame in his hometown. Despite initially telling himself that she is not his type and that her actions are immoral, he finds Minami's forwardness enticing and is genuinely appreciative that she decided to become his friend and help him adjust to life in Hokkaido.

Tsubasa's 16-year-old classmate at Kitami Hokuryo High School, who is popular and talkative. She follows the gal subculture; dyeing her hair blonde, wearing short skirts in winter, and refusing to wear gloves in the winter so that she can still use her phone. She seems to have a crush on Tsubasa and enjoys flirting with him to make him embarrassed and flustered.

Tsubasa and Minami's classmate who, with her raven-hair, reserved personality and choice not to use the Hokkaido dialect, is the exact opposite of Minami. She is very into video games, but pays attention to her appearance; reading fashion and make-up magazines in order to fit in. Because she sweats a lot, Sayuri avoided all forms of exercise, which eventually found her avoiding people in general. Because she has no friends, Sayuri felt a kinship with Tsubasa, and she becomes friends with him and Minami.

Tsubasa's neighbor and senpai or upperclassman one grade above him, whom Minami idolizes. She has short white-gray hair and is believed to be mixed-race. Rena is a history buff and at the top of her class academically but is really timid, even though she has also won the school beauty contest two years in a row. She offers to tutor Tsubasa and asks him to take her on a date in exchange.

Sayuri's childhood friend and underclassman one grade below her. A member of the swim team, she is athletic and has short hair and a dark complexion. Asuka tries to support Sayuri and her romantic feelings for Tsubasa as much as she can.

Asuka's friend and classmate who calls herself Minami's biggest fan. She has long hair and wears big glasses. Having gone to the same middle school as Minami, she is obsessed with her as she resembles her favorite fictional character. Hina follows Minami on the internet and thoroughly researches everything around her, including Tsubasa.

Production
In the original Japanese title, dosanko is a nickname for people from Hokkaido, gyaru refers to a member of the gal subculture, namara is a Hokkaido dialect word meaning "very" or "super", and menkoi is Hokkaido dialect for "cute" or "adorable." It began as a 19-page one-shot titled  that Ikada wrote in five days to represent Hokkaido in the 2018 Jump Scout Caravan Cup. A different one-shot was published in January 2019 as part of a Shōnen Jump+ New Year event, and was selected to become a serialization due to its popularity.

Speaking of the advantages he now has on the digital Shōnen Jump+ as opposed to when he worked in printed manga magazines, Ikada said he now has a high degree of freedom and gets a lot of feedback from readers. On the former he explained he has much more freedom as far as serialization frequency, number of pages, genre and methods of expression. As an example of the feedback he receives, he cited how he gained over 36,000 followers on Twitter by October 2020 thanks to Hokkaido Gals Are Super Adorable!. The series was on hiatus from April to May 2020 due to Ikada's poor health. Originally published weekly, it switched to a biweekly schedule following chapter 49 on February 17, 2021.

Media

Manga
Its chapters have been collected and published into 10 tankōbon volumes by Shueisha as of March 3, 2023. A special one-shot of Hokkaido Gals Are Super Adorable! was published in Weekly Shōnen Jumps first issue of 2021, which was released on December 7, 2020. Shueisha began publishing the series in English for free on the Manga Plus app and website on September 1, 2020.

Hokkaido Gals Are Super Adorable! is receiving a Vomic adaptation, where voice actors, music and sound effects are heard as the manga images appear on screen. Beginning on January 25, 2021, episodes are uploaded to Jump Comics' official YouTube channel.

Volume list

Chapters not yet in tankōbon format
These chapters have yet to be published in a tankōbon volume. They were serialized on Shōnen Jump+.
 Chapters 92–95

Anime
An anime television series adaptation was announced on October 26, 2022. The series is produced by Silver Link and Blade and directed by Misuzu Hoshino, with scripts supervised by Mirai Minato, who also serves as chief director, and character designs handled by Katsuyuki Sato. It is set to premiere in 2023.

Reception
By June 2021, Hokkaido Gals Are Super Adorable! had sold over 300,000 copies. When the first collected volume was released in December 2019, it immediately received a reprint due to demand. Natalie reported that the first and second volumes were each the best-selling manga at the chain store Comic Zin during their respective first weeks of release.

Notes

References

External links
 Official page at Shōnen Jump+ 
 Manga Plus page
 Official anime website 
 

2019 webcomic debuts
2023 anime television series debuts
Anime and manga set in Hokkaido
Anime series based on manga
Gyaru in fiction
Japanese webcomics
Romantic comedy anime and manga
Shōnen manga
Shueisha manga
Silver Link
Upcoming anime television series
Webcomics in print